Antonio Toro was Mayor of Ponce, Puerto Rico from 1833 to 1836.

Mayoral term
During Toro's mayoral administration Hacienda Buena Vista was founded in Barrio Magueyes, Ponce. However, there are no Acts in the Municipality of Ponce for the period 1824 to 1834, affecting at least part of the period while Antonio Toro was mayor as well.

See also

 List of Puerto Ricans
 List of mayors of Ponce, Puerto Rico

References

Mayors of Ponce, Puerto Rico
1780s births
1850s deaths

Year of death uncertain
Year of birth uncertain